Ghost is a Malaysian supernatural mystery thriller television drama series produced by Popiah Pictures. The first season of ten episodes starred Nazrudin Rahman, Cheryl Samad, Carmen Soo, Reefa and Razif Hashim, and aired on 8TV beginning 3 February 2008. The second season of thirteen episodes began airing on 19 April 2009 and stars Cheryl Samad, Anding Indrawani, Isma Hanum, Colin Kirton and Melissa Campbell.

Plot
Season One tells of Eza (Cheryl Samad), a witty journalist endeavouring to solve the mystery surrounding the death of her favourite film star, Zack Imran (Nazrudin Rahman). When Eza meets Zack leaving a hotel, lost and disoriented, her excitement soon turns to fear and confusion as she later discovers that Zack had earlier died, purportedly in a car accident. Realising that only she can see Zack's soul, she sets out with Zack's help to investigate his death. Over time, a bond between the living and the dead materialises.

In Season Two, Eza meets the ghost of a troubled teenager named Harum (Isma Hanum) while investigating the disappearance of Alicia Soo (Melissa Campbell), the socialite daughter of prominent attorney Edmund Soo (Colin Kirton). Edmund enlists the help of a psychic private investigator named Alam (Anding Indrawani) to trace Alicia. Meanwhile, a serial killer begins sending Eza photos of his murder victims, and a link between the murders, Alicia's disappearance, Harum's death and Zack Imran begins to surface.

Cast and characters

Main Characters 
 Cheryl Samad as Eza Azmi, a journalist
 Nazrudin Habibur Rahman as Zack Imran, a former actor

Introduced in Season 1 
 Carmen Soo as Julie Cheah, a model, Eza's best friend
 Radhi Khalid as Dato' Zakaria, Faizura's husband
 Yasmin Isa as Datin Faizura, Zakaria's wife, Zack's former girlfriend
 Sharon Syarafina as Maria Zainal/Susan Voon, Zack's die-hard fan
 Razif Hashim as Azham, Eza's ex-boyfriend
 Nas-T as Farouk, Eza's boyfriend
 Chew Kin Wah as David Tan, a film producer
 Tony Eusoff as Dr Jamal Hafiz, a therapist, police consultant
 Belinda Chee as Cindy Cheah, Julie's older sister
 Reefa as Jimmy Rozario, Zack's manager, a childhood friend

Introduced in Season 2 
 Anding Indrawani Zaini as Alam/Sham Tompok/Zack Wannabe, Eza's ally, a psychic
 Isma Hanum as Harum Abdullah, a former bartender
 Colin Kirton as Edmund Soo Yiuh Hung, a lawyer
 Melissa Campbell as Alicia Soo Yik Peng, a student, friend of Harum
 Fairil Emran Desa as Fariz, Eza's fiancé
 Zahiril Adzim as Ridzuan Salleh, an aspiring singer-songwriter, Harum's boyfriend
 Juliana Evans as Lydia, Fariz's ex-girlfriend

Others 
 Faruq Hafiz as Pak Cik Guard
 Mohd Razak Salimin as Amesh
 Jamal Jamaluddin as Insp. Razak
 Megat Sharizal as Romeo
 Chelsea Ng as Baby
 Jefri Jefrizal as Inspektor Mazdin
 Iedil Putra as Adnan
 Adi Bear as Mansur
 Azmir Abdullah as Dato' Razak
 Azah Yasmin Yusoff as Kasih Ismail
 Wong Wai Hoong as Wai Teong Huat
 Mohammed Falliq as Zafrul Mohamed Attas
 Valerie Vanessa Ebal as Ina Hasnul
 Adzrie Faiz as Johan Putra
 Azri Abdul Hamid as Adli
 Juliana Ibrahim as Ilyana/Estelle
 Daphne Iking as Sara
 Jeff Omar as Pak Hassan

External links
Ghost on 8TV

Malaysian drama television series
2008 Malaysian television series debuts
8TV (Malaysian TV network) original programming